Gong Maoxin and Zhang Ze were the defending champions but lost in the semifinals to Aliaksandr Bury and Peng Hsien-yin.

Denys Molchanov and Igor Zelenay won the title after defeating Bury and Peng 7–5, 7–6(7–4) in the final.

Seeds

Draw

References
 Main Draw

Zhuhai Open - Men's Doubles
2018 Men's Doubles